Hafnium is a chemical element with the symbol Hf and atomic number 72. A lustrous, silvery gray, tetravalent transition metal, hafnium chemically resembles zirconium and is found in many zirconium minerals. Its existence was predicted by Dmitri Mendeleev in 1869, though it was not identified until 1923, by Dirk Coster and George de Hevesy, making it the penultimate stable element to be discovered (the last being rhenium in 1925). Hafnium is named after , the Latin name for Copenhagen, where it was discovered.

Hafnium is used in filaments and electrodes.  Some semiconductor fabrication processes use its oxide for integrated circuits at 45 nanometers and smaller feature lengths. Some superalloys used for special applications contain hafnium in combination with niobium, titanium, or tungsten.

Hafnium's large neutron capture cross section makes it a good material for neutron absorption in control rods in nuclear power plants, but at the same time requires that it be removed from the neutron-transparent corrosion-resistant zirconium alloys used in nuclear reactors.

Characteristics

Physical characteristics

Hafnium is a shiny, silvery, ductile metal that is corrosion-resistant and chemically similar to zirconium (due to its having the same number of valence electrons, being in the same group, but also to relativistic effects; the expected expansion of atomic radii from period 5 to 6 is almost exactly cancelled out by the lanthanide contraction). Hafnium changes from its alpha form, a hexagonal close-packed lattice, to its beta form, a body-centered cubic lattice, at 2388 K.  The physical properties of hafnium metal samples are markedly affected by zirconium impurities, especially the nuclear properties, as these two elements are among the most difficult to separate because of their chemical similarity.

A notable physical difference between these metals is their density, with zirconium having about one-half the density of hafnium. The most notable nuclear properties of hafnium are its high thermal neutron capture cross section and that the nuclei of several different hafnium isotopes readily absorb two or more neutrons apiece. In contrast with this, zirconium is practically transparent to thermal neutrons, and it is commonly used for the metal components of nuclear reactors – especially the cladding of their nuclear fuel rods.

Chemical characteristics

Hafnium reacts in air to form a protective film that inhibits further corrosion.  The metal is not readily attacked by acids but can be oxidized with halogens or it can be burnt in air.  Like its sister metal zirconium, finely divided hafnium can ignite spontaneously in air. The metal is resistant to concentrated alkalis.

As a consequence of lanthanide contraction, the chemistry of hafnium and zirconium is so similar that the two cannot be separated on the basis of differing chemical reactions. The melting points and boiling points of the compounds and the solubility in solvents are the major differences in the chemistry of these twin elements.

Isotopes

At least 36 isotopes of hafnium have been observed, ranging in mass number from 153 to 188. The five stable isotopes are in the range of 176 to 180. The radioactive isotopes' half-lives range from 400 ms for 153Hf to  years for the most stable one, the primordial 174Hf.

The nuclear isomer 178m2Hf was at the center of a controversy for several years regarding its potential use as a weapon.

Occurrence

Hafnium is estimated to make up about 5.8 ppm of the Earth's upper crust by mass. It does not exist as a free element on Earth, but is found combined in solid solution with zirconium in natural zirconium compounds such as zircon, ZrSiO4, which usually has about 1–4% of the Zr replaced by Hf. Rarely, the Hf/Zr ratio increases during crystallization to give the isostructural mineral hafnon , with atomic Hf > Zr. An obsolete name for a variety of zircon containing unusually high Hf content is alvite.

A major source of zircon (and hence hafnium) ores is heavy mineral sands ore deposits, pegmatites, particularly in Brazil and Malawi, and carbonatite intrusions, particularly the Crown Polymetallic Deposit at Mount Weld, Western Australia. A potential source of hafnium is trachyte tuffs containing rare zircon-hafnium silicates eudialyte or armstrongite, at Dubbo in New South Wales, Australia.

Production

The heavy mineral sands ore deposits of the titanium ores ilmenite and rutile yield most of the mined zirconium, and therefore also most of the hafnium.

Zirconium is a good nuclear fuel-rod cladding metal, with the desirable properties of a very low neutron capture cross section and good chemical stability at high temperatures. However, because of hafnium's neutron-absorbing properties, hafnium impurities in zirconium would cause it to be far less useful for nuclear-reactor applications. Thus, a nearly complete separation of zirconium and hafnium is necessary for their use in nuclear power. The production of hafnium-free zirconium is the main source for hafnium.

The chemical properties of hafnium and zirconium are nearly identical, which makes the two difficult to separate. The methods first used — fractional crystallization of ammonium fluoride salts or the fractional distillation of the chloride — have not proven suitable for an industrial-scale production. After zirconium was chosen as material for nuclear reactor programs in the 1940s, a separation method had to be developed. Liquid–liquid extraction processes with a wide variety of solvents were developed and are still used for the production of hafnium. About half of all hafnium metal manufactured is produced as a by-product of zirconium refinement. The end product of the separation is hafnium(IV) chloride. The purified hafnium(IV) chloride is converted to the metal by reduction  with magnesium or sodium, as in the Kroll process.
HfCl4 + 2Mg ->[1100^oC] Hf + 2MgCl2

The hafnium forms a solid coating at the tungsten filament, and the iodine can react with additional hafnium, resulting in a steady iodine turnover and ensuring the chemical equilibrium remains in favor of hafnium production.
Hf + 2I2 ->[500^oC] HfI4
HfI4 ->[1700^oC] Hf + 2I2

Chemical compounds
Due to the lanthanide contraction, the ionic radius of hafnium(IV) (0.78 ångström) is almost the same  as that of  zirconium(IV) (0.79 angstroms). Consequently, compounds of hafnium(IV) and zirconium(IV) have very similar chemical and physical properties. Hafnium and zirconium tend to occur together in nature and the similarity of their ionic radii makes their chemical separation rather difficult. Hafnium tends to form inorganic compounds in the oxidation state of +4. Halogens react with it to form hafnium tetrahalides. At higher temperatures, hafnium reacts with oxygen, nitrogen, carbon, boron, sulfur, and silicon. Some compounds of hafnium in lower oxidation states are known.

Hafnium(IV) chloride and hafnium(IV) iodide have some applications in the production and purification of hafnium metal.  They are volatile solids with polymeric structures. These tetrachlorides are precursors to various organohafnium compounds such as hafnocene dichloride and tetrabenzylhafnium.

The white hafnium oxide (HfO2), with a melting point of 2,812 °C and a boiling point of roughly 5,100 °C, is very similar to zirconia, but slightly more basic. Hafnium carbide is the most refractory binary compound known, with a melting point over 3,890 °C, and hafnium nitride is the most refractory of all known metal nitrides, with a melting point of 3,310 °C. This has led to proposals that hafnium or its carbides might be useful as construction materials that are subjected to very high temperatures. The mixed carbide tantalum hafnium carbide possesses the highest melting point of any currently known compound, . Recent supercomputer simulations suggest a hafnium alloy with a melting point of 4,400 K.

History

In his report on The Periodic Law of the Chemical Elements, in 1869, Dmitri Mendeleev had implicitly predicted the existence of a heavier analog of titanium and zirconium. At the time of his formulation in 1871, Mendeleev believed that the elements were ordered by their atomic masses and placed lanthanum (element 57) in the spot below zirconium. The exact placement of the elements and the location of missing elements was done by determining the specific weight of the elements and comparing the chemical and physical properties.

The X-ray spectroscopy done by Henry Moseley in 1914 showed a direct dependency between spectral line and effective nuclear charge. This led to the nuclear charge, or atomic number of an element, being used to ascertain its place within the periodic table. With this method, Moseley determined the number of lanthanides and showed the gaps in the atomic number sequence at numbers 43, 61, 72, and 75.

The discovery of the gaps led to an extensive search for the missing elements. In 1914, several people claimed the discovery after Henry Moseley predicted the gap in the periodic table for the then-undiscovered element 72. Georges Urbain asserted that he found element 72 in the rare earth elements in 1907 and published his results on celtium in 1911. Neither the spectra nor the chemical behavior he claimed matched with the element found later, and therefore his claim was turned down after a long-standing controversy. The controversy was partly because the chemists favored the chemical techniques which led to the discovery of celtium, while the physicists relied on the use of the new X-ray spectroscopy method that proved that the substances discovered by Urbain did not contain element 72. In 1921, Charles R. Bury suggested that element 72 should resemble zirconium and therefore was not part of the rare earth elements group. By early 1923, Niels Bohr and others agreed with Bury. These suggestions were based on Bohr's theories of the atom which were identical to chemist Charles Bury, the X-ray spectroscopy of Moseley, and the chemical arguments of Friedrich Paneth.

Encouraged by these suggestions and by the reappearance in 1922 of Urbain's claims that element 72 was a rare earth element discovered in 1911, Dirk Coster and Georg von Hevesy were motivated to search for the new element in zirconium ores. Hafnium was discovered by the two in 1923 in Copenhagen, Denmark, validating the original 1869 prediction of Mendeleev. It was ultimately found in zircon in Norway through X-ray spectroscopy analysis. The place where the discovery took place led to the element being named for the Latin name for "Copenhagen", Hafnia, the home town of Niels Bohr. Today, the Faculty of Science of the University of Copenhagen uses in its seal a stylized image of the hafnium atom.

Hafnium was separated from zirconium through repeated recrystallization of the double ammonium or potassium fluorides by Valdemar Thal Jantzen and von Hevesey. Anton Eduard van Arkel and Jan Hendrik de Boer were the first to prepare metallic hafnium by passing hafnium tetraiodide vapor over a heated tungsten filament in 1924. This process for differential purification of zirconium and hafnium is still in use today.

In 1923, six predicted elements were still missing from the periodic table: 43 (technetium), 61 (promethium), 85 (astatine), and 87 (francium) are radioactive elements and are only present in trace amounts in the environment, thus making elements 75 (rhenium) and 72 (hafnium) the last two unknown non-radioactive elements.

Applications
Most of the hafnium produced is used in the manufacture of control rods for nuclear reactors.

Several details contribute to the fact that there are only a few technical uses for hafnium: First, the close similarity between hafnium and zirconium makes it possible to use the more abundant zirconium for most applications; second, hafnium was first available as pure metal after the use in the nuclear industry for hafnium-free zirconium in the late 1950s. Furthermore, the low abundance and difficult separation techniques necessary make it a scarce commodity. When the demand for hafnium-free zirconium dropped following the Fukushima disaster, the price of hafnium increased sharply from around $500–600/kg in 2014 to around $1000/kg in 2015.

Nuclear reactors
The nuclei of several hafnium isotopes can each absorb multiple neutrons. This makes hafnium a good material for use in the control rods for nuclear reactors. Its neutron capture cross section (Capture Resonance Integral Io ≈ 2000 barns) is about 600 times that of zirconium (other elements that are good neutron-absorbers for control rods are cadmium and boron). Excellent mechanical properties and exceptional corrosion-resistance properties allow its use in the harsh environment of pressurized water reactors. The German research reactor FRM II uses hafnium as a neutron absorber. It is also common in military reactors, particularly in US naval reactors, but seldom found in civilian ones, the first core of the Shippingport Atomic Power Station (a conversion of a naval reactor) being a notable exception.

Alloys

Hafnium is used in alloys with iron, titanium, niobium, tantalum, and other metals. An alloy used for liquid-rocket thruster nozzles, for example the main engine of the Apollo Lunar Modules, is C103 which consists of 89% niobium, 10% hafnium and 1% titanium.

Small additions of hafnium increase the adherence of protective oxide scales on nickel-based alloys. It improves thereby the corrosion resistance especially under cyclic temperature conditions that tend to break oxide scales by inducing thermal stresses between the bulk material and the oxide layer.

Microprocessors
Hafnium-based compounds are employed in gate insulators in the 45 nm generation of integrated circuits from Intel, IBM and others. Hafnium oxide-based compounds are practical high-k dielectrics, allowing reduction of the gate leakage current which improves performance at such scales.

Isotope geochemistry
Isotopes of hafnium and lutetium (along with ytterbium) are also used in isotope geochemistry and geochronological applications, in lutetium-hafnium dating. It is often used as a tracer of isotopic evolution of Earth's mantle through time. This is because 176Lu decays to 176Hf with a half-life of approximately 37 billion years.

In most geologic materials, zircon is the dominant host of hafnium (>10,000 ppm) and is often the focus of hafnium studies in geology. Hafnium is readily substituted into the zircon crystal lattice, and is therefore very resistant to hafnium mobility and contamination. Zircon also has an extremely low Lu/Hf ratio, making any correction for initial lutetium minimal. Although the Lu/Hf system can be used to calculate a "model age", i.e. the time at which it was derived from a given isotopic reservoir such as the depleted mantle, these "ages" do not carry the same geologic significance as do other geochronological techniques as the results often yield isotopic mixtures and thus provide an average age of the material from which it was derived.

Garnet is another mineral that contains appreciable amounts of hafnium to act as a geochronometer. The high and variable Lu/Hf ratios found in garnet make it useful for dating metamorphic events.

Other uses
Due to its heat resistance and its affinity to oxygen and nitrogen, hafnium is a good scavenger for oxygen and nitrogen in gas-filled and incandescent lamps. Hafnium is also used as the electrode in plasma cutting because of its ability to shed electrons into air.

The high energy content of 178m2Hf was the concern of a DARPA-funded program in the US. This program eventually concluded that using the above-mentioned 178m2Hf nuclear isomer of hafnium  to construct high-yield weapons with X-ray triggering mechanisms—an application of induced gamma emission—was infeasible because of its expense. See hafnium controversy.

Hafnium metallocene compounds can be prepared from hafnium tetrachloride and various cyclopentadiene-type ligand species. Perhaps the simplest hafnium metallocene is hafnocene dichloride. Hafnium metallocenes are part of a large collection of Group 4 transition metal metallocene catalysts  that are used worldwide in the production of polyolefin resins like polyethylene and polypropylene.

A pyridyl-amidohafnium catalyst can be used for the controlled iso-selective polymerization of propylene which can then be combined with polyethylene to make a much tougher recycled plastic.

Hafnium diselenide is studied in spintronics thanks to its charge density wave and superconductivity.

Precautions
Care needs to be taken when machining hafnium because it is pyrophoric—fine particles can spontaneously combust when exposed to air. Compounds that contain this metal are rarely encountered by most people. The pure metal is not considered toxic, but hafnium compounds should be handled as if they were toxic because the ionic forms of metals are normally at greatest risk for toxicity, and limited animal testing has been done for hafnium compounds.

People can be exposed to hafnium in the workplace by breathing it in, swallowing it, skin contact, and eye contact. The Occupational Safety and Health Administration (OSHA) has set the legal limit (permissible exposure limit) for exposure to hafnium and hafnium compounds in the workplace as TWA 0.5 mg/m3 over an 8-hour workday. The National Institute for Occupational Safety and Health (NIOSH) has set the same recommended exposure limit (REL). At levels of 50 mg/m3, hafnium is immediately dangerous to life and health.

References

Literature

External links

 Hafnium at Los Alamos National Laboratory's periodic table of the elements
 Hafnium at The Periodic Table of Videos (University of Nottingham)
 Hafnium Technical & Safety Data
 NLM Hazardous Substances Databank – Hafnium, elemental
 Don Clark: Intel Shifts from Silicon to Lift Chip Performance - WSJ, 2007
 Hafnium-based Intel 45nm Process Technology
 CDC - NIOSH Pocket Guide to Chemical Hazards
 https://colnect.com/en/coins/list/composition/168-Hafnium

 
Chemical elements
Transition metals
Neutron poisons
1923 in science
Chemical elements with hexagonal close-packed structure